Dodecylbenzene is an organic compound with the formula . Dodecylbenzene is a colorless liquid with a weak oily odor that floats on water.

This colourless waxy solid consists of a dodecyl group attached to a phenyl group. Dodecylbenzene is a precursor to sodium dodecylbenzenesulfonate, a surfactant that is a key ingredient of household laundry detergents, such as detergent powder.

Production
This compound and some related alkylbenzenes are produced industrially by alkylation of benzene with the corresponding alkenes in the presence of hydrogen fluoride or related acid catalysts.  The resulting linear alkylbenzene compounds are sulfonated to give the corresponding sulfonic acids.  This sulfonation can be highly specific to place the sulfonic acid group across the ring, in the 4-position.  The resulting sulfonic acid is then neutralized with base to give sodium alkylbenzenesulfonate, which is subsequently blended with other components to give various cleaning products.

References

External links 
 Safety MSDS data

Alkylbenzenes
Phenyl compounds